The Diocese of Gliwice is a Latin Church ecclesiastical territory or diocese of the Catholic Church in Poland. Its episcopal see is located in the city of Gliwice. The Diocese of Gliwice is a suffragan diocese in the ecclesiastical province of the Archdiocese of Katowice. , about 91% of the population in the territory of the diocese is self-described Catholic, however only 39% are practising Catholics.

History
 March 25, 1992: Established as Diocese of Gliwice from the Diocese of Częstochowa, Diocese of Katowice, and the Diocese of Opole

Leadership
 Bishops of Gliwice
 Bishop Jan Walenty Wieczorek (March 25, 1992 – December 29, 2011)
 Bishop Jan Kopiec (since December 29, 2011)
 Bishop Sławomir Oder (since February 11, 2023) 
 Auxiliary bishops of Gliwice
 Bishop Gerard Kusz (March 25, 1992 – November 15, 2014)
 Bishop Andrzej Iwanecki (since January 7, 2018)

See also
Roman Catholicism in Poland

Sources
 GCatholic.org
 Catholic Hierarchy
  Diocese website

References

Roman Catholic dioceses in Poland
Christian organizations established in 1992
Gliwice
Roman Catholic dioceses and prelatures established in the 20th century